The Uthangarai block is a revenue block in the Krishnagiri district of Tamil Nadu, India. In total, it contains 34 panchayat villages.

References 
 

Revenue blocks of Krishnagiri district